The helix is the prominent rim of the auricle. Where the helix turns downwards posteriorly, a small tubercle is sometimes seen, namely the auricular tubercle of Darwin.

Additional images

See also

References

Ear